The 1997 Cupa României Final was the 59th final of Romania's most prestigious cup competition. The final was played at the Stadionul Naţional in Bucharest on 4 June 1997 and was contested between Divizia A sides Steaua București and Naţional București. The cup was won by Steaua.

Route to the final

Match details

References

External links
 Official site 

Cupa
Cupa României Finals
FC Steaua București matches